The fourteenth series of Dancing on Ice began airing on ITV on 16 January 2022. During the finale of the thirteenth series, it was announced that Dancing on Ice had been renewed for another series. The series was once again filmed in the purpose-built studio at Bovingdon Airfield, which was set up for the tenth series. Phillip Schofield and Holly Willoughby returned as the hosts. Christopher Dean, Jayne Torvill and Ashley Banjo returned as judges for their fifth series, whilst it was announced on 3 October 2021, that John Barrowman would not be returning to the judging panel. In December, Strictly Come Dancing professional Oti Mabuse was confirmed as Barrowman's replacement. Arlene Phillips also joined the panel as a guest judge for Musicals Week on 20 February.

Schofield tested positive for COVID-19 on 31 January and was therefore unable to present the fourth live show on 6 February. Stephen Mulhern therefore co-hosted alongside Willoughby instead. Alex Crook also replaced Sam Matterface as commentator for the same show, due to the latter commentating the 2021–22 FA Cup Liverpool v Cardiff City match. Willoughby tested positive for COVID-19 on 13 March and was unable to present that evening's show. Schofield therefore presented the semi-final episode on his own.

The series final was postponed by a week due to the 2021–22 FA Cup Nottingham Forest v Liverpool quarter-finals match which took place on 20 March. The final therefore aired on 27 March, with Regan Gascoigne and his professional partner Karina Manta winning the series.

Professional skaters
On 26 October 2021, it was announced that Vicky Ogden, Hamish Gaman and Klabera Komini would not be returning for the fourteenth series. Gaman revealed via social media that he had been axed from the series due to producers wanting to "freshen the lineup" of skaters. The axed skaters were replaced by three new professionals; Colin Grafton, Morgan Swales and Tippy Packard. Packard received a celebrity partner, whilst Grafton and Swales appeared in the professional group routines.

Couples
On 4 October 2021, Sally Dynevor and Bez were announced as the first two celebrities to be participating in the series. More celebrities were revealed throughout the following days, before the line-up was concluded on 12 October.

Scoring chart

 indicates the couple eliminated that week
 indicates the couple were in the skate-off but not eliminated
 indicates the couple withdrew from the competition
 indicates the winning couple
 indicates the runner-up couple
 indicates the third-place couple
 indicate the highest score for that week
 indicate the lowest score for that week
"—" indicates the couple(s) that did not skate that week

Average chart
This table only counts for dances scored on a traditional 40-point scale. The scores from week 6 are weighted to work on the same scale, and the extra points from the Skate Battle are not included.

Live show details

Week 1 (16 January)
 Group performance: "Rhythm Is a Dancer"—Alex Christensen & The Berlin Orchestra feat. Ivy Quainoo (performed by professional skaters)
"Warriors"—Imagine Dragons (performed by professional skaters)

Week 2 (23 January)
 Head judge: Torvill
 Group performance: "Higher Power"—Coldplay (performed by professional skaters)
 Torvill & Dean performance: "Lucy in the Sky with Diamonds"—Elton John

Due to Rachel Stevens sustaining a wrist fracture, Rachel & Brendyn didn't perform this week.

Save Me skates
Ria & Łukasz: "Me!"—Taylor Swift feat. Brendon Urie of Panic! at the Disco
Ben & Robin: "Wonderful Tonight"—Eric Clapton
Judges' votes to save
Banjo: Ria & Łukasz
Mabuse: Ria & Łukasz
Dean: Ria & Łukasz
Torvill: Did not need to vote but would have saved Ria & Łukasz

Week 3 (30 January)
 Theme: Movies
 Head judge: Dean

Due to Kye Whyte sustaining a knee sprain, Kye & Tippy didn't perform this week.

Save Me skates
Rachel & Brendyn: "Need You Now"—Lady A
Ria & Łukasz: "Me!"—Taylor Swift feat. Brendon Urie of Panic! at the Disco
Judges' votes to save
Banjo: Rachel & Brendyn
Mabuse: Rachel & Brendyn
Torvill: Rachel & Brendyn
Dean: Did not need to vote but would have saved Rachel & Brendyn

Week 4 (6 February)
 Theme: Dance
 Head judge: Torvill
 Group performance: "Alone"—Jessie Ware (performed by Łukasz Różycki and Alexandra Schauman, in tribute to Sean Rice.)
 As Phillip Schofield tested positive for COVID-19 this week, Stephen Mulhern replaced him as host whilst Alex Crook replaced Sam Matterface as commentator.
 Connor & Alexandra were due to perform first this week, however due to Connor falling and cutting his chin in practice before the live show, Rachel & Brendyn performed first instead. The former later performed eighth but kept the same voting number had he gone first.

Save Me skates
 Rachel & Brendyn: "Need You Now"—Lady A
 Kye & Tippy: "Sanctify"—Years & Years
Judges' votes to save
Banjo: Kye & Tippy
Mabuse: Kye & Tippy
Dean: Kye & Tippy
Torvill: Did not need to vote but would have saved Kye & Tippy

Week 5 (13 February)
 Theme: Favourite things
 Head judge: Dean
 Torvill & Dean performance: "Come Dance with Me"—Frank Sinatra

Save Me skates
 Kye & Tippy: "Sanctify"—Years & Years
 Liberty & Joe: "Stronger"—Britney Spears
Judges' votes to save
Banjo: Kye & Tippy
Mabuse: Liberty & Joe
Torvill: Kye & Tippy
Dean: Kye & Tippy

Week 6 (20 February)
 Theme: Musicals
 Guest judge: Arlene Phillips
 Head judge: Torvill
 Group performance: One Night Only—from Dreamgirls (all)
 Special musical guest: "Six"—from Six

Due to Vanessa Bauer testing positive for COVID-19, Brendan Cole performed with Brendyn Hatfield for this week.

Save Me skates
 Bez & Angela: "Step On"—Happy Mondays
 Sally & Matt: "We've Only Just Begun"—The Carpenters
Judges' votes to save
Banjo: Sally & Matt
Mabuse: Sally & Matt
Phillips: Sally & Matt
Dean: Did not need to vote but would have saved Sally & Matt
Torvill: Did not need to vote but would have saved Sally & Matt

Week 7 (27 February)
 Theme: Prop Week
 Head judge: Dean
 Group performance: "Touch"—Little Mix/"Move Your Body"—Sia (performed by professional skaters and Oti Mabuse)

Save Me skates
 Sally & Matt: "We've Only Just Begun"—The Carpenters
 Kye & Tippy: "Sanctify"—Years & Years
Judges' votes to save
 Banjo: Kye & Tippy
 Mabuse: Kye & Tippy
 Torvill: Kye & Tippy
 Dean: Did not need to vote but would have saved Kye & Tippy

Week 8 (6 March)
 Theme: Torvill & Dean
 Head judge: Torvill
 Group performance: "Greatest Day"—Take That (all)
 Guest performance: "I Was Made for Lovin' You"/"Rock and Roll All Nite"—Kiss (Lilah Fear and Lewis Gibson)

Save Me skates
 Kye & Tippy: "Sanctify"—Years & Years
 Stef & Andy: "How Am I Supposed to Live Without You"—Michael Bolton
Judges' votes to save
 Banjo: Kye & Tippy
 Mabuse: Kye & Tippy
 Dean: Kye & Tippy
 Torvill: Did not need to vote but would have saved Kye & Tippy

Week 9: Semi-final (13 March)
 Theme: Solo skate
 Head judge: Dean
 Group performance: "Don't Go Yet"—Camilla Cabello (performed by professional skaters)
 "Heroes"—Zayde Wølf (Solo Skate Battle)
 Special musical guest: Westlife—"Alone Together"
 As Holly Willoughby tested positive for COVID-19 this week, Phillip Schofield hosted on his own.

Save Me skates
 Connor & Alexandra: "Stop Crying Your Heart Out"—Oasis
 Kimberly & Mark:  "Lost Without You"—Freya Ridings
 Kye & Tippy: "At the Hop"—Danny & the Juniors
Judges' votes to save
 Banjo: Kimberly & Mark 
 Mabuse: Kimberly & Mark 
 Torvill: Kimberly & Mark 
 Dean: Did not need to vote but would have saved Kimberly & Mark

Week 10: Final (27 March)
 Themes: Showcase, Favourite skate; Boléro
 Group performance: "I Lived"—OneRepublic (all)
 Torvill & Dean performance: "Gold Forever"—The Wanted (with professional skaters)

References

External links
 Official website

Series 14
2022 British television seasons